Success Power Station is a natural gas-fired station owned by SaskPower, located in Success, Saskatchewan, Canada and operated as a peaking plant.

Description 

The Success Station consists of:
 1 - 30 MW unit, commissioned in 1967/8

See also 

 SaskPower

References

External links 
 SaskPower Station Description

Natural gas-fired power stations in Saskatchewan
SaskPower